The Jacob Weber House is located in Wisconsin Dells, Wisconsin.

History
The house was built by Jacob Weber, Postmaster of what was then Kilbourn City. Photographer H. H. Bennett bought the house in 1891 and his family lived there until 1971. The house was listed on the National Register of Historic Places in 1978 and on the State Register of Historic Places in 1989.

References

Houses on the National Register of Historic Places in Wisconsin
National Register of Historic Places in Columbia County, Wisconsin
Houses in Columbia County, Wisconsin
Greek Revival architecture in Wisconsin
Houses completed in 1863